Norbert Angermann (born 2 November 1936 in Forst (Lausitz)) is a German historian.

Angermann studied Baltic history in Middle Ages, especially the history of Livland, and Russo-German relationships during the same period. His teacher was Paul Johansen. He was Professor of Eastern European History in University of Hamburg and has been Emeritus since 2002. Norbert Angermann served as an editor for several books, so aside of Robert Auty (volume 1) and Robert-Henri Bautier (volumes 2 bis 5) for the volumes 6 to 9 of the Lexikon des Mittelalters. He lives in Buchholz in der Nordheide.

Literature

Author 
 Die Deutschen in Litauen. Ein geschichtlicher Überblick. Nordostdeutsches Kulturwerk, Lüneburg 1996, .
 Die baltischen Länder. Ein historischer Überblick. Nordostdeutsches Kulturwerk, Lüneburg 1990.
 Hermann Kellenbenz (Hrsg.) unter Mitarbeit von Norbert Angermann: Europäische Wirtschafts- und Sozialgeschichte vom ausgehenden Mittelalter bis zur Mitte des 17. Jahrhunderts. Klett-Cotta, Stuttgart 1986, .
  Studien zur Livlandpolitik Ivan Groznyjs. Dissertation. Herder-Institut, Marburg (Lahn) 1972, .

Editor 
 Robert Auty, Robert-Henri Bautier, Norbert Angermann (Hrsg.): Lexikon des Mittelalters. Metzler, Stuttgart und Weimar, 
 with Michael Garleff and Wilhelm Lenz: Ostseeprovinzen, baltische Staaten und das Nationale. Festschrift für Gert von Pistohlkors zum 70. Geburtstag, Schriften der Baltischen Historischen Kommission Band 14; LIT Verlag, Münster 2005 
 in it: Norbert Angermann: Carl Schirrens Vorlesungen über die Geschichte Livlands, Seiten 213 - 226
 Norbert Angermann and Klaus Friedland (Hrsg.): Novgorod. Markt und Kontor der Hanse. Böhlau, Köln u.a. 2002, .
 Norbert Angermann and Paul Kaegbein (Hrsg.): Fernhandel und Handelspolitik der baltischen Städte in der Hansezeit. Nordostdeutsches Kulturwerk, Lüneburg 2001, .
 Norbert Angermann and Ilgvars Misāns (Hrsg.): Wolter von Plettenberg und das mittelalterliche Livland. Nordostdeutsches Kulturwerk, Lüneburg 2001, 
 as editor: Deutschland - Livland - Russland. Ihre Beziehungen vom 15. bis zum 17. Jahrhundert. (= Beiträge aus dem Historischen Seminar der Universität Hamburg), Verlag Nordostdeutsches Kulturwerk, Lüneburg 1988

References

External links
 Publications of Norbert Angermann
 Literature from and about Angermann

1936 births
Living people
People from Forst (Lausitz)
People from the Province of Brandenburg
20th-century German historians
German male non-fiction writers
Academic staff of the University of Hamburg
Recipients of the Order of the Cross of Terra Mariana, 4th Class